Morgan Spector   is an American actor. Spector has appeared in the TV series Allegiance (2015), The Mist (2017), Homeland (2018), and Pearson (2019), as well as the films The Drop (2014), Christine (2016), and A Vigilante (2018). He starred in the HBO project The Plot Against America, and also appears in the network's The Gilded Age.

Early life
Spector grew up in Guerneville, California. His father was an attorney and his mother worked in public education as a teacher and then as an administrator. He acted for the first time in community theater at the age of eight; and later acted in high school and college productions. After graduating from Reed College, in Portland, Oregon, he enrolled in the acting school of the American Conservatory Theater, in San Francisco, and then pursued work in regional theater, including a tour in The Lion King. He moved to New York City in 2006. Spector is Jewish on his father's side. His paternal grandmother was an actress in the New York Yiddish Theatre District.

Career
In 2010 Spector made his Broadway debut as Rodolpho in Gregory Mosher's revival of Arthur Miller's play A View from the Bridge – a role he was unexpectedly called upon to play (having originally been cast in a bit part, as a longshoreman) when the actor scheduled for the role was injured during previews. In 2012 he played the role of Boris in The New Group's Off-Broadway production of The Russian Transport, by Erika Sheffer.

In 2014 he co-starred with Rebecca Hall in a Broadway revival of Sophie Treadwell's Machinal. They appeared together on stage in New York again in June 2017, after marrying, in Clare Lizzimore's play Animal. They have also appeared together on screen in the 2016 drama Christine and the 2017 film Permission.

In 2018 Spector starred alongside Olivia Wilde in the drama A Vigilante. In 2019, he starred alongside Gina Torres in the legal drama Pearson on USA Network, a spin-off of Suits.

In 2020, he starred in the HBO miniseries adaptation of Philip Roth's The Plot Against America, alongside Winona Ryder. In 2022, he also headlines alongside Cynthia Nixon and Christine Baranski in HBO's The Gilded Age.

Personal life
In September 2015 Spector married actress Rebecca Hall, whom he had first met the year before, during their work together in the Broadway play Machinal. Their first child was born in 2018.

Filmography

Film

Television

Theatre

References

External links
 

Living people
21st-century American Jews
21st-century American male actors
American male film actors
American male stage actors
American male television actors
Jewish American male actors
Male actors from Santa Rosa, California
People from Guerneville, California
Reed College alumni
Year of birth missing (living people)